Asghari is a surname. Notable people with the surname include:

Ahmad Reza Asghari, Iranian diplomat
Elham Asghari (born 1981), Iranian female swimmer
Hadi Asghari (born 1981), Iranian football striker 
Javad Asghari Moghaddam (born 1979), Iranian futsal player
Sam Asghari (born 1994), Iranian-American model
Samira Asghari (born 1994), Afghan member of the International Olympic Committee
Vahid Asghari (born 1986), Iranian journalist and free speech activist